is a winter festival of electric light held in Hiroshima, Japan since 2002. "Dreamination" is a composite word coined from "dream" and "illumination".

Overview
The festival is hosted by the Light-up Hiroshima Project Executive Committee and supported by all public and private broadcasters in Hiroshima as a winter night attraction in for residents and visitors. Every street in downtown Hiroshima, together with the town squares are illuminated with a million and a half LED lights.

Theme and staging dates

Sites
 Green belt of Peace Boulevard – main venue

 Namiki-dori
 Kinzagai
 Chuo-dori
 Hondōri
 Nakanotana
 Hiroshima Alice Garden
 Higashi-Shinnten-chi public plaza
 Eastern riverside of Motoyasu River
 The former Hiroshima Branch of the Bank of Japan – one of the Hiroshima buildings hit by the 1945 atomic bomb.
 Kamiyachō Shareo
 NTT Motomachi Cred
 Hakushima Q-Garden
 Urban View Grand Tower

Illuminated streetcars
 Illuminated streetcars are operated by Hiroshima Electric Railway

Events
 Opening Event – parade, opening ceremony, lighting up ceremony, mini concerts on the first day
 Memorial Light up Ceremony and Mini Concert – every Saturday and on two national holidays in front of Hiroshima Crystal Plaza on Peace Boulevard
 Photo Contest
 Monument Design Contest
 Dreami coffee shop

Sponsorships

Sponsor
 Hiroshima Light-up Project Executive Committee

Co-sponsors
 Chugoku Shimbun – Japanese daily newspaper for Chūgoku region, based in Hiroshima
 NHK Hiroshima – Japan Broadcasting Corporation, Hiroshima
 Hiroshima Telecasting
 Hiroshima Home Television
 Shinhiroshima Telecasting
 Hiroshima FM
 Hiroshima P-station
 Fureai Channel

References

External links
 Hiroshima Dreamination Official website 
 Hiroshima Dreamination 2008

Festivals in Hiroshima
Winter festivals in Japan